Phaeotrichum is a genus of fungi in the family Phaeotrichaceae.

References

External links
Index Fungorum

Pleosporales